Newmarket by-election may refer to:

 1903 Newmarket by-election
 1913 Newmarket by-election